Emily Holmes is a Canadian television and film actress.

She has appeared in such television series as Night Visions, Mysterious Ways, The Dead Zone (Chapter 1 and 2 of the first season), Stargate SG-1, Dark Angel and more. In 2002, Holmes appeared in Steven Spielberg's Taken as Julie Crawford. She also appeared in the webisode series Battlestar Galactica: The Resistance and Gene Roddenberry's Andromeda.

Filmography

Film

Television

External links
 

Canadian film actresses
Canadian television actresses
Living people
21st-century Canadian actresses
1977 births